Oatman Flat Station, later Fourr's Stage Station, was a stagecoach station of the Butterfield Overland Mail located along the Gila River in Maricopa County, Arizona. It is to the east of the Oatman Grave, where the family of Olive Oatman was buried following their massacre on the Southern Emigrant Trail by Yavapai in 1851.

References

External links
 Ruins of Oatman Flat Stage Station, Oatman, AZ, c. 1910, from Sharlot Hall Museum Transportation Image Collection; Sharlot Hall Museum Transportation Collection (actually the Fourr's Stage Station second to be built at the flat.)
 Graves Along the Butterfield Trail In Arizona – Why are they disappearing? Posted by Gerald T. Ahnert on April 4, 2013 at 7:22am in The Bucket. See 1970 photo of the ruin of the Fourr's Stage Station and includes the site of the Fourr family graves and nearby location of the original Oatman Flat Station.

Butterfield Overland Mail in New Mexico Territory
American frontier
Pre-statehood history of Arizona
History of Arizona
Former populated places in Maricopa County, Arizona
Stagecoach stations in Arizona